Cedric Haswell Liddell (June 11, 1913 – June 4, 1981) was a Canadian rower who competed in the 1932 Summer Olympics and the 1936 Summer Olympics.

In 1932 he won the bronze medal as member of the Canadian boat in the eights competition. He also competed in the 1936 eights competition.

External links
 Olympic profile

1913 births
1981 deaths
Canadian male rowers
Olympic bronze medalists for Canada
Olympic rowers of Canada
Rowers at the 1932 Summer Olympics
Rowers at the 1936 Summer Olympics
Olympic medalists in rowing
Medalists at the 1932 Summer Olympics